Yantai South railway station is a railway station located in Laishan District, Yantai, Shandong, China. Unlike the older Yantai railway station, this is a through-station. It opened with the Qingdao–Rongcheng intercity railway on 28 December 2014. It will be served by Tianjin–Weifang–Yantai high-speed railway in future.

References 
 

Railway stations in Shandong
Railway stations in China opened in 2014